Carine is a feminine given name. Notable people with the name include:

 Carine Adler (born 1948), Brazilian film director
 Carine Goren (born 1974), Israeli pastry chef, cookbook author, and television baking show host
 Carine Quadros (born 1981), Brazilian actress
 Carine Roitfeld (born 1954), French businesswoman, editor-in-chief of French Vogue (magazine)
 Carine Russo (born 1962), Belgian politician and a member of Ecolo 
 Carine Mbuh Ndoum Yoh (born 1993), Cameroonian footballer
 Cairine Wilson (1885–1962), Canadian senator

See also
 Carin
 Karine

French feminine given names

br:Carine